Alan Morrissey (born 9 October 1982) is a British actor. He grew up in Stockport at the Farmers Arms Pub, of which his parents were the licensees, before moving to Oldham. Morrissey trained at Bristol Old Vic Theatre School. In 2002 and again in 2003, Dame Maggie Smith and The Fenton Arts Trust awarded him the bursary for talented potentials. He graduated from the Old Vic Theatre School in 2004.

Career

He made his film debut in The League of Gentlemen's Apocalypse, in 2005, starring alongside Steve Pemberton and Bruno Langley. Morrissey became best known for his television debut as Nick Van Barr in the BBC medical drama series Holby City. He left the show in 2010, after 18 episodes.

On 2 September 2013, it was announced Morrissey is to play the role of Max in the West End musical I Can't Sing! The X Factor Musical, which opened in March 2014 at the London Palladium. Other principals included Nigel Harman and Cynthia Erivo.

Morrissey is currently a member of the London-based artistic collective The Factory Theatre Company. He has appeared in their performances of 'Round One', 'Round Two' and 'The Seagull Experiment' in venues across London as well as performing in 'Boiling Frogs' at the Southwark Playhouse. Other Factory members include Alex Hassell, Catherine Bailey and Laura Rees.

Acting credits

References

London Theatre Database
50/50 at the Hampstead
Romeo and Juliet Blog

External links
 
 Alan Morrissey C.V
 Factory Theatre Company

English male television actors
Alumni of Bristol Old Vic Theatre School
1982 births
Living people
English male stage actors
Male actors from Oldham
Actors from Stockport
21st-century English male actors
English male film actors